The Phantom Horseman is a 1990 Australian television film about a mysterious masked horseman. The film portrays the adventure of a group of children who are whisked away to a strange island, and their encounters with pirates and a character known as The Phantom Horseman.

References

External links

Australian television films
1990 television films
1990 films
1990s English-language films
Films directed by Howard Rubie
1990s Australian films